The president of the Chamber of Nationalities was the presiding officer of the Chamber of Nationalities of the Federal Assembly of Yugoslavia.

Office-holders
Ljupčo Arsov
Vida Tomsić
Mika Špiljak

Sources
Various editions of The Europa World Year Book

Chamber of Nationalities, Presidents
Yugoslavia, Chamber of Nationalities